The following is the complete bibliography of Edgar Rice Burroughs. The titles are listed chronologically as written.

List of works
Note: Numbers in parentheses following years indicate months

References
Edgar Rice Burroughs C.H.A.S.E.R. Encyclopedia
Chronology of the Life and Works of Edgar Rice Burroughs

 
Bibliographies by writer
Bibliographies of American writers
Science fiction bibliographies
Fantasy bibliographies